Kerowlee may refer to:

Places
Kerowlee, a former spelling of Karauli, a town in the state of Rajasthan in India

Ships
USS Kerowlee (1901), a United States Navy cargo ship in commission from 1918 to 1919